Cuatro Caminos is an administrative neighborhood of Madrid belonging to the district of Tetuán. As of 1 February 2020, it has a population of 35,395. It was created as slum of the north of the city, on the east side of the Road of France, currently the calle de Bravo Murillo.

Many of the streets located in the neighborhood are named after Spanish provinces, including Guipúzcoa, Cuenca, Oviedo, Palencia, Jaén, Teruel, Ávila, Salamanca, and La Coruña.

One of the financial districts of Madrid, AZCA, spreads across the southeast of the neighborhood.

See also 
 Plaza de Pablo Ruiz Picasso
 Monument to General Perón (Madrid)

References 
Citations

Bibliography
 
 
 

Wards of Madrid
Tetuán (Madrid)